Giorgio Biasiolo (born 16 February 1946) is an Italian former professional footballer, who played as a midfielder. He made 197 appearances and scored 16 goals in Serie A, for Vicenza and Milan, during the late 1960s and 1970s.

Honours

Club 
A.C. Milan
Coppa Italia: 1971–72, 1972–73, 1976–77
Cup Winners' Cup: 1972–73

External links 
Profile at MagliaRossonera.it 
Profile at EmozioneCalcio.it 

1946 births
Living people
Italian footballers
Serie A players
Serie B players
Association football midfielders
L.R. Vicenza players
A.C. Milan players
U.S. Lecce players